Robert Muir (6 April 1907 – 11 June 1973) was an Australian rules footballer who played with Collingwood, Footscray and Fitzroy in the Victorian Football League (VFL).

Under Jock McHale, Collingwood won premierships in each of Muir's first three seasons at the club but he didn't participate in any of the finals campaigns. He missed the entire 1930 VFL season when Collingwood made it four in a row. He finally got regular game time in 1932 and made 17 appearances for the year, including two finals. It was however his last season with Collingwood and he finished his VFL career with stints at Footscray and Fitzroy.

Muir continued playing football in the VFA, with Preston, which he coached in 1938 when Wyn Murray resigned during the season.

Footnotes

References

 Muir is Consistent, The Sporting Globe, (Wednesday, 20 August 1930), p.8.
 Magpie Astray, The Sporting Globe, (Saturday, 16 June 1934), p.7.
 Unfair Football: Six Players Charged: Three Disqualifications, The Argus, (Friday, 15 May 1931), p.5.

External links
 
 Bob Muir, at The VFA Project.

1907 births
Collingwood Football Club players
Longford Football Club players
Western Bulldogs players
Fitzroy Football Club players
Preston Football Club (VFA) players
Preston Football Club (VFA) coaches
Australian rules footballers from Victoria (Australia)
1973 deaths
Australian rules footballers from Western Australia
People from Boulder, Western Australia